A list of Iraq national football team results:

 Iraq national football team results (1957–69)
 Iraq national football team results (1970–79)
 Iraq national football team results (1980–89)
 Iraq national football team results (1990–99)
 Iraq national football team results (2000–09)
 Iraq national football team results (2010–19)
 Iraq national football team results (2020–present)
 Iraq national football team results (unofficial matches)

References

External links
 Iraqi Football Website
 History of Iraq National Team
 FIFA.com
 World Football Elo Ratings: Iraq